Ectopatria euglypta is a moth of the family Noctuidae. It is found in South Australia and Western Australia.

External links
Australian Faunal Directory

Moths of Australia
Noctuinae
Moths described in 1908